The Battle of Temalaca was a battle of the War of Mexican Independence that occurred on 5 November 1815 in the area around Temalaca, Puebla. The battle was fought between the royalist forces loyal to the Spanish crown and the Mexican rebels fighting for independence from the Spanish Empire. The Mexican insurgents were commanded by José María Morelos and the Spanish by Manuel de la Concha. The battle resulted in a victory for the Spanish Royalists.

At the end of the battle, Morelos was captured by Spanish forces under whose control he was soon after executed ending the second phase of the Mexican War of Independence.

See also 
 Mexican War of Independence
 José María Morelos

Bibliography 

Temalaca
Temalaca
Temalaca
Temalaca
1815 in New Spain
November 1815 events